Scobinancistrus pariolispos is a species of catfish in the family Loricariidae. It is native to South America, where it occurs in the Tapajós and Tocantins River basins in Brazil. The species reaches 27 cm (10.6 inches) in total length.

S. pariolispos appears in the aquarium trade, where it is typically referred to either as the golden cloud pleco or by its associated L-number, which is L-048.

References 

Fish described in 1989
Loricariidae